Takoradi Senior High School (TADISCO) is a coeducational second-cycle institution in Takoradi in the Western Region of Ghana.

History
Takoradi Senior High School (popularly known as TADISCO) is a co-educational institute. Originally it was named Regional Secondary School.
It is sited in West Tanokrom in the Effia-Kwesimintsim Municipal.it was established in 1958 as a private secondary school by Mr.J.E.Eyeson.
Government took over the school at the end of November 1963 and absorbed it into the public system of education, it therefore became Takoradi Secondary School (TADISCO).

Notable alumni
Fiifi Adinkra, blogger
Joseph Otsiman, actor, producer and radio presenter/DJ
WillisBeatz, sound engineer, record producer and DJ
Nero X, singer, songwriter
Fiifi Buckman, lawyer and politician

See also

 Christianity in Ghana
 Education in Ghana
 List of senior high schools in Ghana

References

1958 establishments in Ghana
Educational institutions established in 1958
Christian schools in Ghana
High schools in Ghana
Public schools in Ghana
Sekondi-Takoradi
Education in the Western Region (Ghana)